Maribel Domínguez Castelán (born 18 November 1978) is a Mexican former footballer who played for the Chicago Red Stars during 2013 season of the National Women's Soccer League, and was captain and leading scorer of the Mexico women's national football team. She is known internationally as Marigol for her record of 46 goals scored in 49 matches for the Mexico women's national team.

Domínguez has played professionally in the United States, Spain, and Mexico. In 2003, she was the first Mexico-born player to sign for a team in the Women's United Soccer Association (WUSA), the top division in the United States at the time. As a forward for the Atlanta Beat, she was a leading scorer in the league during its final year of operation. In 2004, she made international headlines when she signed for a men's team in Mexico but was denied by FIFA. From 2005 to 2013, she played professionally for several teams around the world including FC Barcelona, UE L'Estartit, San Diego Sunwaves, Chicago Red Stars, and UAEH Panteras.

Domínguez has played the most games (116) in the history of the women's national team. She has also scored the most goals (82) out of any single Mexico national player, including among those in the men's squad. In 2004, she was ranked in FIFA's top 25 women players in the world. She is the only Mexico player to have appeared in and scored for the Mexico squad in Olympic Games, World Cup, CONCACAF Gold Cup and Pan American Games.

Early life
The youngest of ten children, Domínguez was born in Mexico City, Mexico, and grew up in the rural suburb of Chalco.  Despite the perception of sport by her father, she played when young football with her three brothers, though her father did not approve: "My father was very old-fashioned, and he didn't like soccer. He didn't even like that my brothers played soccer. When he went to work, I would sneak out of the house to go and practice in the street." Domínguez did not find a girls' team to play on until she was a teenager. Domínguez fooled the boys in the neighborhood she grew up in into playing with her by keeping her hair short like a boy. They called her Mario and only found out that she was a girl when her picture appeared in the newspaper after she made it on the sub-national women's team.

In 1997, Domínguez joined a women's team called Inter and was forced to have a full body inspection by a female Mexico league official to validate her sex due to her short hair and ability to "play like a man." Domínguez told the inspector, "All right, but only if you do the same." She was not questioned again.

Playing career

Club

Kansas City Mystics, 2002
With the absence of a women's professional league in Mexico, Domínguez immigrated to the United States to play with the Kansas City Mystics in 2002 and further her development as a footballer. During her first and only season with the Mystics, she led the league with 17 goals and 12 assists while helping the team clinch the Midwest Division title. She subsequently earned the Most Valuable Player award from the W-League.

Atlanta Beat, 2003
The following year, Domínguez signed with the Atlanta Beat in the Women's United Soccer Association (WUSA), the top division of professional soccer in the United States at the time. She was the first Mexico-born player to sign with the league since its inception in 2001. During her first month with the team, she was named the league's Player of the Month after scoring five goals and two assists in three games.  She scored seven goals during the 2003 season and was a leading scorer in the league. Of her experience, she said, "It's very special for me to be in the top scoring position in this league. It's the best thing that has happened to me in my career, right up there with scoring in the 1999 Women's World Cup." The Beat finished second in the standings with a 9–4–8 record.

Denied by FIFA and playing professionally in Spain, 2004–12
In December 2004, Domínguez made international headlines when she signed a two-year contract for second division men's team, Atlético Celaya, in Guanajuato, Mexico. Domínguez said of the signing, "The thing is, that in Mexico we don't have even a decent amateur league for women, so you have to look for other options... I knew that the decision could go either way, but were expecting a yes. The hard thing is going to be equaling the physical force of the men, but the technique, the desire, the willpower, those are things that I already have." While the Mexican Football Association did not object, they deferred to FIFA headquarters in Zurich for an official ruling. FIFA ruled against mixed-sex football teams stating, "There must be a clear separation between men's and women's football." Furthermore, a ban was placed on Domínguez for playing in an exhibition game outside the league but still alongside men. "I just wanted to be given the chance to try," Domínguez said. "If I failed I would have been the first to say I can't do it, the first to admit it doesn't work. But at least I would have tried."

Beginning in early 2005, Domínguez played for FC Barcelona in Spain's top division league, Superliga Femenina. The team was struggling to avoid relegation. Her debut for FC Barcelona occurred on 30 January 2005 during a match against Torrejón where she scored a hat-trick and helped the squad win 5–3. Barcelona remained in the Superliga and renewed Domínguez's contract for another year. She was one of the first foreign women's footballers to be given a license to play in Spain.

In January 2007, Domínguez signed with UE L'Estartit in Spain's second division. Despite playing only half the season, she scored 22 goals and helped the club win the championship title and ascend to the first division Superliga for the following season – a first-ever for the team. In the 2007 summer season, Domínguez fulfilled a prior obligation to play for San Diego Sunwaves in the American W-League. She scored on her debut against Vancouver Whitecaps and finished with three goals in three games. During the 2007–08 season, Domínguez scored 15 goals for UE L'Estartit in the Superliga Femenina.

During the 2008–09 Superliga Femenina season Domínguez was still enjoying playing for L'Estartit. She revealed it was her ultimate dream to coach the Mexico women's national team. She had started coaching L'Estartit's youth teams the previous season. Difficulties with her visa and commitments with the Mexico national team eventually reduced Domínguez's playing time with UE L'Estartit. In the first half of the 2011–12 Superliga Femenina season she appeared four times. In April 2012 UE L'Estartit admitted defeat in their attempts to bring her back to Spain.

Chicago Red Stars and UAEH Panteras, 2013

In 2013, Domínguez joined the Chicago Red Stars for the inaugural season of the National Women's Soccer League (NWSL), the top division professional soccer league in the United States. Along with Mexico national teammate, Dinora Garza, she was allocated to the Red Stars as part of the NWSL Player Allocation. Domínguez started in 9 of her 16 appearances for the Red Stars, playing a total of 705 minutes. She scored two goals during the season: one game-opener goal during a 3–3 draw against FC Kansas City on 14 July and another game-opener during a 3–3 draw against Sky Blue FC on 11 August. Chicago finished the 2013 season sixth in the standings with an 8–6–8 record.

After the American season Domínguez returned to Mexico to play for UAEH Panteras, a Super Liga Femenil de Fútbol team affiliated to Universidad Autónoma del Estado de Hidalgo. She scored a debut hat-trick in the Panthers' 6–2 win over Laguna FC in August 2013.

International
As of 2013, Domínguez has played the most games (109) and scored the most goals (75) in the history of the women's national team. She is the only Mexico player to have appeared and scored for the Mexico team in Olympic Games, World Cup, CONCACAF Gold Cup and Pan American Games.

Domínguez received her first call-up to the Mexico women's national football team in 1998 at the age of 20, and helped the team qualify for the 1999 FIFA Women's World Cup. She scored Mexico's only goal in the tournament during a 7–1 loss to Brazil at Giants Stadium in East Rutherford, New Jersey. In 2002, she was part of the Mexico squad that earned a bronze medal in the CONCACAF Women's Gold Cup. With nine goals, she was the top scorer during the CONCACAF Women's Olympic Qualifying Tournament for the 2004 Athens Olympics, a first in the history of the Mexico national team. During the 2004 Olympics in Athens, Greece, Domínguez led the Mexico national team to the quarter-finals and scored the team's only goal during the tournament. The following year, she was ranked in FIFA's top 25 women players in the world and was nominated for the FIFA Player of the Year award.

On 5 November 2010, Domínguez scored the opening goal in Mexico's 2–1 upset victory over the United States during the semifinals of the CONCACAF Women's World Cup Qualifying Tournament. She ran under a looping pass to sneak behind the United States' defensive line just past two minutes into the game and tapped her shot past the American goalkeeper to give Mexico the early lead.

In 2011, Domínguez captained the Mexico squad to a bronze medal win at the 2011 Pan American Games in Guadalajara, Mexico. During the team's second group stage match against Trinidad and Tobago, she scored Mexico's only goal on a penalty kick in the 42nd second. Her equalizer resulted in a 1–1 draw. After Mexico won their third group stage match 1–0 against Colombia, the team advanced to the semi-finals where they were defeated 1–0 by Brazil.

The same year, Domínguez led CONCACAF's second-place team to play in the 2011 FIFA Women's World Cup in Germany. The squad's opening group stage match resulted in a 1–1 draw against England at Volkswagen-Arena in Wolfsburg in front of 18,702 spectators. During its second group stage match on 1 July, Mexico was defeated 4–0 by the eventual gold medal-winning team, Japan. During its third and final group stage match against New Zealand, Domínguez scored Mexico's second goal in the 29th minute lifting the score to 2–0 after her teammate Stephany Mayor scored in the second minute of the game. New Zealand scored in the 90th and during stoppage time to level the final score to 2–2. Mexico did not advance to the quarter-finals.

In 2012, Domínguez scored 3 goals during the qualifying round of the 2012 CONCACAF Women's Olympic Qualifying Tournament held in Vancouver, British Columbia, Canada; however, the team was eliminated en route to the 2012 London Olympics.

Appearances and goals at international tournaments

FIFA World Cup

Olympic Games

CONCACAF Gold Cup

Pan American Games

Managerial career

Mexico U-15 girls' national football team 

On August 8, 2018. Mexico U-15 girls' national football team finished as runners up at the 2018 CONCACAF Girls' Under-15 Championship

Mexico U-20 Women’s national football team 
Domínguez was named manager of the Mexico women's national under-20 football team on January 19, 2021. She led the team to qualify for the upcoming 2022 FIFA U-20 Women's World Cup as well as reaching the final of the  2022 CONCACAF Women's U-20 Championship.

On July 21, 2022, Dominguez and her coaching staff were suspended and separated from the team by the FMF due to a matter that required an internal investigation to be open.

Honors and awards

Player
 2002 W-League Most Valuable Player 
 2002 W-League Team of the Week (3 times)
 2003 WUSA Player of the Month
 2005 FIFA Player of the Year nominee

Manager
Mexico U-15 girl's national football team

 CONCACAF Girls' Under-15 Championship: Runners Up: 2018

See also

 List of footballers with 100 or more caps
 List of Mexico women's international footballers
 List of 2011 Pan American Games medal winners
 List of foreign NWSL players

References

Further reading
 Friedman, Ian C. (2007), Latino Athletes, Infobase Publishing,

External links

 
 Chicago Red Stars player profile
 Atlanta Beat (WUSA) player profile
 

1978 births
Living people
Mexican women's footballers
Mexico women's international footballers
Footballers at the 2004 Summer Olympics
Footballers at the 2011 Pan American Games
Olympic footballers of Mexico
Footballers from Mexico City
Women's United Soccer Association players
Atlanta Beat (WUSA) players
Mexican expatriate women's footballers
Expatriate women's soccer players in the United States
Expatriate women's footballers in Spain
2011 FIFA Women's World Cup players
FIFA Century Club
National Women's Soccer League players
Chicago Red Stars players
1999 FIFA Women's World Cup players
FC Barcelona Femení players
UE L'Estartit players
San Diego Sunwaves players
Women's association football forwards
Mexican expatriate sportspeople in Spain
Pan American Games bronze medalists for Mexico
Pan American Games medalists in football
Medalists at the 2011 Pan American Games
Mexican footballers